Leon Curtis Frierson (born July 6, 1986) is an American actor, rapper, songwriter, and comedian, best known for his work on the Nickelodeon comedy show All That.

All That

In 1997, Leon Frierson, Christy Knowings, and Danny Tamberelli joined the cast of All That to replace the departing Katrina Johnson and Alisa Reyes. Leon's agent had called him about the job and he auditioned at the Nickelodeon/MTV building in Los Angeles. He did impressions of "an old man, nerds, Jim Carrey and Mike Tyson."

Leon's recurring sketches and/or characters include Have a Nice Day with Leroy & Fuzz, CJ and the Cloudy Nights, Repairboy (with Kel Mitchell as Repairman), and Billy Fuco. He stayed on the show until the end of Season 6 in 2000. He also appeared, during his run on All That, as a panelist on the network's game show Figure It Out.

Later career
When Frierson ended his run on All That, he had appeared in the movies Bulworth and Snow Day. He also appeared in a December 12, 2003 episode of Boston Public as Brady Bennett.

References

External links
"music video -Get It"
"music"
"website" 

1986 births
Living people
20th-century American male actors
21st-century American male actors
Male actors from California
American male child actors
American male film actors
American male television actors
American male comedians
People from Ontario, California
African-American male comedians
African-American male actors
Comedians from California
Rappers from California
American male rappers
20th-century American comedians
21st-century American comedians
21st-century American rappers
21st-century American male musicians
20th-century African-American male singers
21st-century African-American musicians